Jesús Ramón Martínez de Ezquerecocha Suso (31 August 1935 − 16 February 2013) was a Spanish-born Ecuadorian Roman Catholic bishop.

Born in Spain and ordained to the priesthood on 9 August 1959, Martínez de Ezquerecocha Suso was named bishop of the Roman Catholic Diocese of Babahoyo, Ecuador on 28 June 1984 and resigned on 27 March 2008.

References

1935 births
2013 deaths
20th-century Roman Catholic bishops in Ecuador
Spanish Roman Catholic bishops in South America
21st-century Roman Catholic bishops in Ecuador
Roman Catholic bishops of Machala
Roman Catholic bishops of Babahoyo